Manfred Fiess (born 26 May 1941) is a South African sports shooter. He competed in the men's 50 metre rifle prone event at the 1992 Summer Olympics.

References

1941 births
Living people
South African male sport shooters
Olympic shooters of South Africa
Shooters at the 1992 Summer Olympics
Place of birth missing (living people)
20th-century South African people